Florian Bauer (born 11 February 1994) is a German bobsledder.

He won a medal at the IBSF World Championships 2020.

References

External links

Florian Bauer at the German Bobsleigh, Luge, and Skeleton Federation 

1994 births
Living people
German male bobsledders
Bobsledders at the 2022 Winter Olympics
Olympic bobsledders of Germany
Medalists at the 2022 Winter Olympics
Olympic medalists in bobsleigh
Olympic silver medalists for Germany